Musicians of the King's Road (Finnish: Kuninkaantien muusikot, Swedish: Kungsvägens musiker) is a Finnish professional baroque orchestra and choir. The orchestra plays on period instruments.

Orchestra and choir 
Musicians of the King's Road is a professional baroque orchestra and choir. The ensemble was founded in autumn 2008 in Turku in Finland. It is specialised in performing musical rarities written by European composers. The orchestra plays on period instruments. Conductor Markus Yli-Jokipii was the artistic director of Musicians of the King's Road from 2009 to 2015.

Several compositions have been performed for the first time in Finland by Musicians of the King's Road. Many of these works have lain forgotten in archives for a long time and have consequently not been performed for centuries, neither in Finland nor elsewhere. In spring 2013, Musicians of the King's Road performed the 400-year-old St Matthew Passion written by the German composer Melchior Vulpius. The performances were given within a liturgical context in four churches in Southwest Finland. On Good Friday 2014, the passion was performed in the Taulumäki Church in Jyväskylä and a year later in the church of Vähäkyrö in Vaasa. Later on, Musicians of the King’s Road has continued the passion cycle by performing historical passion settings by Antoine de Longueval, Jakob Meiland, Johann Walter, Christoph Demantius and Bartholomäus Gesius. These performances were conducted by Jonas Rannila.

In 2012, Musicians of the King's Road started a series of concerts that presents rare musical instruments for which works were written by many composers of the classical period. In the opening concert William Zeitler played the glass harmonica. The series continued on the Night of the Arts 2013 when Paolo Tognon, who is specialised in historical wind instruments such as bassoons and dulcians, appeared as soloist on baroque bassoon. In January 2014, when Musicians of the King's Road performed the Te Deum by Marc-Antoine Charpentier, the orchestra included a historical serpent. In the same concert, the instrument called Chinese hat was heard probably for the first time ever in Finland. Later in the same year, Sigiswald Kuijken appeared as soloist with Musicians of the King's Road on violoncello da spalla. On the Night of the Arts 2015, the instrument in focus was the lira-chitarra, played by Eleonora Vulpiani from Italy. The next instrument presented in the series was the tromba marina played by Eberhard Maldfeld from Germany. In the same concert, another rarity, the wooden timpani, could be heard for the first time in Finland. In January 2019, Maija Lampela played as soloist on the so-called violin for women, pardessus de viole, and in October the same year Marieke Van Ransbeeck from Belgium appeared in the series on musette de cour, French baroque bagpipe.

Acknowledgements 
Musicians of the King's Road was chosen the regionally most significant cultural project in 2010 by the Finnish Cultural Foundation, Varsinais-Suomi regional fund.

The Pro Musica Säätiö foundation that supports performers of classical music in Finland awarded Musicians of the Kin'gs Road a grant in 2012.

In 2017, Musicians of the King’s Road was awarded the Mikael Agricola 2007 Jubilee medal by the Mikael Agricola Society for the cycle of historical passion settings performed as a part of the Reformation anniversary festivities.

Publicity 
Musicians of the King's Road gives concerts regularly but has not made any recordings. It mainly performs in concerts that are its own productions and its publicity approach also includes not appearing with videos on YouTube. The Finnish Broadcasting Company Yle has broadcast several of its concerts.

Turku Night of the Arts festival 
Since 2016, Musicians of the King’s Road has been responsible for coordinating the official programme of the Night of the Arts festival in Turku. The event celebrated its 30th anniversary in 2019.

References

External links 
Official website

Finnish orchestras
Turku
2008 establishments in Finland
Musical groups established in 2008
Early music choirs
Early music groups
Mixed early music groups